Ghataron is a village in Shaheed Bhagat Singh Nagar district of Punjab State, India. The village is administrated by Sarpanch an elected representative of the village.

Demography 
As of 2011, Ghataron has a total number of 348 houses and population of 1618 of which 829 include are males while 789 are females according to the report published by Census India in 2011. The literacy rate of Ghataron is 86.03%, higher than the state average of 75.84%. The population of children under the age of 6 years is 136 which is 8.41% of total population of Ghataron, and child sex ratio is approximately 915 as compared to Punjab state average of 846.

Most of the people are from Schedule Caste which constitutes 55.87% of total population in Ghataron. The town does not have any Schedule Tribe population so far.

As per the report published by Census India in 2011, 570 people were engaged in work activities out of the total population of Ghataron which includes 435 males and 135 females. According to census survey report 2011, 85.09% workers describe their work as main work and 14.91% workers are involved in Marginal activity providing livelihood for less than 6 months.

Education 

Transport 

See also 
List of villages in India

References

External links 
 Tourism of Punjab
 Census of Punjab
 Locality Based PINCode

Villages in Shaheed Bhagat Singh Nagar district